Calystegia (bindweed, false bindweed, or morning glory) is a genus of about 25 species of flowering plants in the bindweed family Convolvulaceae. The genus has a cosmopolitan distribution in temperate and subtropical regions, but with half of the species endemic to California.  They are annual or herbaceous perennial twining vines growing 1–5 m tall, with spirally arranged leaves. The flowers are trumpet-shaped, 3–10 cm diameter, white or pink, with (in most species) a sometimes inflated basal epicalyx.

The genus bears much similarity to a related genus Convolvulus, and is sometimes combined with it; it is distinguished primarily by the pollen being smooth, and in the ovary being unilocular.

Some of the species, notably Calystegia sepium and C. silvatica, are problematic weeds, which can swamp other more valuable plants by climbing over them, but some are also deliberately grown for their attractive flowers.

Calystegia species are eaten by the larvae of some Lepidoptera species including Bedellia somnulentella (recorded on C. sepium) and small angle shades.

The name is derived from two Greek words kalyx or kalux, "cup", and stege, "a covering", meaning "a covering cup", this refers to the large bracts that cover the sepals.

Species
The following species are recognised in the genus Calystegia:

Calystegia affinis
Calystegia atriplicifolia – nightblooming false bindweed
Calystegia binghamiae 
Calystegia brummittii
Calystegia catesbiana – Catesby's false bindweed
Calystegia collina – Coast Range false bindweed
Calystegia felix
Calystegia hederacea – Japanese false bindweed
Calystegia × howittiorum
Calystegia × krauseana
Calystegia longipes – Paiute false bindweed, plateau morning glory 
Calystegia × lucana
Calystegia macaunii –  Macoun's false bindweed
Calystegia macrostegia – island false bindweed
Calystegia malacophylla –  sierra false bindweed
Calystegia marginata – small-flowered white bindweed New Zealand
Calystegia × melnikovae
Calystegia occidentalis – chaparral false bindweed
Calystegia peirsonii – Peirson's false bindweed
Calystegia pellita – hairy false bindweed
Calystegia pubescens
Calystegia × pulchra – hairy bindweed
Calystegia purpurata – Pacific false bindweed
Calystegia × scania
Calystegia sepium – large bindweed, hedge bindweed, bearbind, hedgebell (type species) 
Calystegia silvatica – great bindweed, shortstalk bindweed
Calystegia soldanella – sea bindweed, seashore false bindweed, beach morning glory
Calystegia spithamaea – low false bindweed, upright bindweed
Calystegia stebbinsii – Stebbins' false bindweed, Stebbins' morning glory
Calystegia subacaulis – hillside false bindweed
Calystegia tuguriorum – New Zealand bindweed, pōuwhiwhi, pōwhiwhi, rarotawake
Calystegia vanzuukiae

References

Flora of China: Calystegia

External links
 

 
Convolvulaceae genera
Taxa named by Robert Brown (botanist, born 1773)